MyVoucherCodes.co.uk is an online voucher code company, currently owned by Future plc.

Company history
MyVoucherCodes.co.uk launched by Mark Pearson in 2006 in his bedroom with £300. He initially started a company that delivered printed messages on roses called Roses by Design, but moved into vouchers after he found he was making more money promoting others products rather than his own and noticed there were no coupon sites in the UK. Initially, Pearson paid someone to build a website and then set up a tech team based in Rotherham, and once the site started making money, a sales team in Glasgow. In the first year MyVoucherCodes had a turnover of £300,000. In 2011 the company bought VouChaCha in 2011, which became their mobile location-based player, and the following year they bought Last Second Tickets, a discounted tickets reseller for sport, events and attractions. In the first half of the decade they also expanded to France, Germany, and United States, and then to Italy, Spain, and Netherlands. In June 2014, after suffering a significant drop in revenue from £8m to £4.5m due to Google Algorithm changes, he sold parent company Markco Media to Monitise for £55m in an all-shares deal, including earnouts. Pearson owned 100% of the business, having grown it by using the positive cashflow rather than taking investment. Next, the company started to focus on mobile traffic. By 2014 60,000 businesses used MyVoucherCodes.

In early 2017 MyVoucherCodes acquired Happiour, a geo-location based app that offers consumers local food and drink offers. Between 2015 and 2017 the company made YouTube ads with students from the School of Communication Arts on a budget of £700 that parodied the John Lewis Christmas TV ads. In July 2017, Monitise, the parent company of MyVoucherCodes was acquired by US financial services provider Fiserv. In December 2017, UK price comparison website GoCompare.com announced it was buying MyVoucherCodes for £36.5m.

Awards
The Masters of Marketing Awards 2017 - #BudgetBuster
PRCA South East and East Anglia Awards - Digital and Social Media Campaign of the Year

References

External links
 Official website

Companies based in the City of Westminster
Internet properties established in 2006
Reward websites
Online companies of the United Kingdom
2006 establishments in the United Kingdom
2017 mergers and acquisitions